The London Museum and Institute of Natural History was a private natural history museum of the Georgian era. It opened to a paying public in 1807.

The museum was founded by Edward Donovan at Catherine Street, the Strand, London, England. Unlike William Bullock's Egyptian Hall Donovan's museum focused on specimens found in Great Britain and was a scientific collection arranged according to the Linnaean system.

The museum exhibited hundreds of cases of specimens of British mammals, birds, reptiles, fishes, insects, shells, corals, minerals, fossils (or "productions of the Antediluvian World") and botanical specimens. The 1808 catalogue numbers the collection at "nearly thirty thousand individual articles" and
describes the museum as "a national academy of the natural history of the country". The botany section was described as the "most perfect assemblage of the botanical productions of Great Britain that can exist in any museum".

The London Museum and Institute of Natural History promoted the sale of Donovan's sumptuously illustrated natural history publications which were based on the specimens exhibited. The museum closed in the spring of 1817 and its contents were auctioned in 1818.

References
Edward Donovan Catalogue of the Principal Objects of Curiosity Contained in the London Museum, and Institute of Natural History, Catherine Street, Strand Rivington, 1808 87 pages
2008 Bulletin of the Hunt Institute for Botanical Documentation Vol. 20, No. 1 
1975 Newsletter of the Geological Curators Group Vol1 No3 

Natural history museums in London
Defunct museums in London
19th century in London